Ellert Björgvinsson Schram (born 10 October 1939) is an Icelandic former footballer and politician.

Football career

Club
At club level Ellert played as a forward for Knattspyrnufélag Reykjavíkur and competed at the 1966–67 European Cup, scoring two goals against FC Nantes. He played in the Icelandic top-tier league from 1957 to 1971, scoring 62 goals.
He won the Icelandic Football Cup 7 times with KR from 1960 to 1967. He was captain of Knattspyrnufélag Reykjavíkur when they played Liverpool FC in August 1964 which was Liverpools first ever European game losing 5-1 and 11-1 overall on aggregate.

International
Ellert was part of the Iceland national football team between 1959 and 1970. He played 23 matches, scoring 6 goals.

Managerial career
He was the manager of KR during the 1973 season.

Titles
 Icelandic championships: 1959, 1961, 1963, 1965, 1968
 Icelandic Football Cup (7): 1960, 1961, 1962, 1963, 1964, 1966, 1967

Political career
After his playing days where over, Ellert served as the chairman of the Football Association of Iceland from 1973 to 1989. He served as a member of Alþingi for the Independence Party, from 1971 to 1979 and again from 1983 to 1987, and for the Social Democratic Alliance from 2007 to 2009.

References

External links
Biography at Alþingi

1939 births
Living people
Ellert Schram
Ellert Schram
Ellert Schram
Ellert Schram
Association football forwards
Ellert Schram
Ellert Schram
Ellert Schram